{{Infobox military conflict
| conflict          = Heglig Crisis
| partof            = 
| image             = South Sudan Sudan Locator-cropped.png
| image_size        = 300px
| caption           = 
| date              = 26 March – 26 September 2012()
| place             = Along the entire Sudan–South Sudan border, although the main fighting took place at Heglig
| territory         = South Sudanese withdrawal from Heglig
| result            = Sudanese victory
 Agreement on borders and natural resources signed on 26 September
| combatant1        =  JEM SPLM-N
| combatant2        = 
| commander1        = ' Salva Kiir James Gatduel Gatluak
| commander2        =  Omar al-Bashir Ahmed Haroun
| units1            = 
| units2            = 
| strength1         = SPLA and Mathiang Anyoor:unknown (at Heglig)Overall:140,000 soldiers110 tanks69 artillery pieces10 helicopters
| strength2         = SAF:2,000 (at Heglig)Overall:109,300 soldiers17,500 paramilitaries390 tanks115 light tanks490 armoured personnel carriers778 artillery pieces63 combat airplanes29 helicopters
| casualties1       = 31 killed (South Sudanese claim)1,200 killed (Sudanese claim)106 woundedSeveral captured
| casualties2       = 256 killed (South Sudanese claim)100 wounded50 captured (Sudanese claim)1 MiG-29 shot down
| casualties3       = 29 civilians killed
| notes             = The casualty numbers are based on the warring parties claims and have not been independently verified.
| campaignbox       = 

}}

The Heglig Crisis''' was a brief war fought between the countries of Sudan and South Sudan in 2012 over oil-rich regions between South Sudan's Unity and Sudan's South Kordofan states. South Sudan invaded and briefly occupied the small border town of Heglig before being pushed back by the Sudanese army. Small-scale clashes continued until an agreement on borders and natural resources was signed on 26 September, resolving most aspects of the conflict.

 Background 
South Sudan's independence was preceded by two civil wars, from 1955 to 1972 and from 1983 to 2005, in which 2.5 million people were killed and more than 5 million externally displaced. Relations between the two states have been marked by conflict over the Greater Nile Oil Pipeline and the disputed region of Abyei, even though Sudan was the first state to recognise South Sudan. In January 2012, South Sudan shut down all of its oil fields in a row over the fees Sudan demanded to transit the oil.

In May 2011, it was reported that Sudan had seized control of Abyei, a disputed oil-rich border region, with a force of approximately 5,000 soldiers after three days of clashes with South Sudanese forces. The precipitating factor was an ambush by the South killing 22 northern soldiers. The northern advance included shelling, aerial bombardment and numerous tanks. Initial reports indicated that over 20,000 people fled. The interim South Sudanese government declared this as an "act of war," and the United Nations sent an envoy to Khartoum, the Sudanese capital, to intervene. South Sudan says it has withdrawn its forces from Abyei. A deal on militarization was reached on 20 June 2011. The United Nations Interim Security Force for Abyei, consisting of Ethiopian troops were deployed under a UNSC resolution from 27 June 2011. In early December 2011, Jau, a town in Unity state in South Sudan, was occupied by Sudanese forces. In early March 2012, the Sudanese Air Force bombed parts of Pariang county.

Each country accuses the other of supporting rebels on their soil as part of the ongoing internal conflict in Sudan and in South Sudan.

 Events 

 26–28 March South Sudanese repulsed from Heglig 

On 26 March, the Republic of Sudan claimed that South Sudan attacked the Heglig oilfield (called Panthou by South Sudan), located in the Sudanese state of South Kordofan, while South Sudan claims it was acting in self-defence after an attack on its territory. The South Sudanese attack was supported by the Sudanese rebel group JEM, which attacked from Unity State. The following day, 27 March, the Sudanese Air Force launched a bombing raid on the Unity oilfield in the South Sudanese state of Unity, located to the north of the state capital, Bentiu. The Sudanese Army later attacked the disputed areas of Jau, Pan Akuach, and Teshwin, but were repelled by the South Sudanese Sudan People's Liberation Army.

South Sudanese artillery positions 20 kilometres north of Bentiu, which had been involved in the shelling of Heglig, were bombarded by artillery from the northern side of the border. The Republic of Sudan's Information Minister, Abdallah Ali Masar, confirmed that South Sudanese had penetrated 10 km into Sudanese territory, but also claimed that Sudanese forces had repelled them and driven them back, and had taken several prisoners.

South Sudanese troops were ordered by their government to disengage and withdraw from the disputed area on 28 March. Dead bodies and destroyed vehicles lay strewn in Heglig, the oilfield which was the site of bloody battles. Three bodies were identified as Southern Sudanese soldiers, while a tank as well as 4 pickup trucks were destroyed.

On 31 March, Sudanese warplanes bombed the Southern forces positions on the border, although officials from the north said it was artillery, not aircraft involved in the attack.

 Early April: South Sudanese capture of Heglig 
South Sudan claimed to have shot down a Sudanese MiG-29 warplane on 4 April over Unity state in South Sudan. The air raids reportedly took place near Heglig and forced an Al Jazeera camera crew to take cover, as Sudanese planes bombed an oil pipeline. The bombing did not apparently lead to any casualties or significant damage. The Sudanese government denied any bombing from the air had taken place and called the accusations "fabrications" by South Sudan.

The South Sudanese town of Teshwin, according to the South Sudanese armed forces, was shelled with artillery and warplanes by Sudan on 9 April. The town of Abiemnhom in Unity state was reportedly attacked by two brigades from the Sudanese army, which the South claimed was an attempt to seize its oil fields. At least four civilians were injured in the clashes, although there were no immediate reports of military casualties on either side. The South's government said that northern forces had breached the border accompanied by militias, but had been repelled. A Sudanese military spokesman later admitted that the Sudanese army had been defeated during a battle at Heglig and forced to retreat northwards. There were some reports that the fighting had broken out after Sudanese forces attempted to retake a border post lost to Southern forces two weeks previous. Colonel Khalid Sawarmi, spokesman for the Sudanese army, claimed that the Southern forces had taken control of the Heglig oil fields and the town of Heglig itself, given South Sudan victory in the Battle of Heglig. In this second capture of Heglig the SPLA was again supported by the JEM. The in response to the fighting, the President and his advisors organized an all-volunteer militia, Mathiang Anyoor, which was supposed to aid the SPLA in fighting the Sudanese. The militia later transformed into a private army and became infamous for committing numerous atrocities during the subsequent South Sudanese Civil War.

The Sudanese government said on 11 April that heavy fighting continued along the disputed border areas and the Sudanese army was reported to be trying to retake Heglig. Sudan announced they would use all legitimate means to retake the Heglig oil fields that fell to South Sudan the previous day. South Sudan said that they were holding defensive positions in Heglig, awaiting a Sudanese counterattack.

The parliaments of both countries called for a mobilisation of their respective armed forces. Sudan also began a general mobilisation of its armed forces as South Sudanese forces penetrated as far north as 70 kilometres into Sudanese territory, according to Rahmatullah Mohamed Osman, Under Secretary for the Foreign Ministry of Sudan. After Heglig fell, the government in Khartoum said its forces had made a tactical retreat to Kharasanah, and despite having put up strong resistance, had been unable to overcome the "huge, well equipped forces" that had attacked the area. Sudanese forces were reported to be regrouping and preparing to try to retake Heglig. The Sudanese Revolutionary Front rebel group attacked the Sudanese army in Karshanah, where they had retreated following clashes by the South Sudanese Army.

Vice President Al-Haj Adam of Sudan formally declared that a state of war existed between the two countries late on 11 April and declared that all negotiations between the two states were on hold. The next day, the Sudanese Air Force bombed Bentiu, the capital of Unity State, in an attempt to destroy a strategic bridge using an Antonov An-26 transport plane converted into an improvised bomber, killing one South Sudanese soldier.

 Mid-April: Sudanese counter offensive 

South Sudanese forces began reinforcing their positions in Heglig on 13 April, whilst Sudan continued to mobilise its own forces. According to the South Sudanese government, the frontlines had remained static during the day. Sudanese forces claimed to be advancing on Heglig and that the situation would be dealt with "within hours." A spokesman of the Sudanese government said that its army was on the outskirts of Heglig, while South Sudan's government said that it would defend themselves if attacked. The Sudanese government spokesman also added that South Sudan failed to control "all of South Kordofan state." During Friday prayers on 13 April in Sudan, some sermons were reportedly hostile towards South Sudan, while television broadcasts included allegedly jihadi' and patriotic songs.

South Sudan's Vice President Reik Machar said a Sudanese attempt to retake Heglig by force was halted 30 km north of the town. South Sudan claimed to have destroyed two tanks during the clashes. The Sudanese air force, operating two Sukhoi Su-25 jets, reportedly bombed Jau and Panakuach, as well as Heglig once again, killing five civilians. On 14 April, South Sudanese forces continued to advance northwards, and repelled a Sudanese counterattack on Kersanah. Southern troops moved to close all three roads to Heglig on 14 April. It was also reported that most facilities in Heglig had been damaged during the fighting. Two MiG-29s from the Sudanese Air Force swooped in low over Bentiu the same day in an attempt to destroy a bridge. The bombs narrowly missed their target and ended up killing four civilians and a soldier and wounding five others. The attack was widely believed to be an attempt to damage South Sudanese supply lines.

Sudanese army units were reported to have reached a few kilometres from Heglig and that they were fighting with South Sudanese forces. The immediate objective was to "destroy the South's war machine", rather than enter Heglig itself. South Sudan disputed the north's version of events as propaganda, claiming that northern forces were still 30 kilometres (19 miles) from Heglig. On 15 April, the Sudan People's Liberation Army spokesman Philip Aguer claimed that after overnight clashes in Kelet South Sudan held on to its positions and destroyed two Sudanese tanks.

Sudan shelled the western part of South Sudan's Upper Nile state during 15 April, in an apparent attempt to open up a new front. Sudanese troops crossed the border into South Sudan's Upper Nile state and briefly occupied the small town of Kuek, before being expelled by South Sudan's army.

On 16 April, Sudan's parliament met and voted unanimously to declare that "South Sudan is an enemy of all Sudanese state agencies". The parliamentary speaker called for Sudan to mobilise all its resources to fight South Sudan and topple their government. Rabie Abdelaty, a spokesman for the Khartoum government, ruled out peace talks with the South, saying it would hurt national pride if Sudan did not take back Heglig by force.

The clash was reportedly sparked when a South Sudanese soldier was shot dead when collecting water near the road between Aweil and Meiram.

Late April: Sudan regains control over Heglig 
On 22 April, Sudanese army entered Heglig oil field. Afterwards, Sudanese president Omar al-Bashir held a victory rally in Khartoum.

At least one South Sudanese soldier was killed and two wounded in the attack.
Sudan bombed the town of Rubkona on 23 April, damaging several market stalls, in an attempt to destroy a bridge between Rubkona and neighbouring Bentiu. At least three people were killed in the raid. The following day, Kiir stated on a visit to China that Sudan had "declared war" on South Sudan.

At the end, both sides were standing where they stood when the fighting broke out, with neither side clearly gaining the upper hand. Eventually, ground fighting subsided, and although the conflict continued with isolated border skirmishes and limited Sudanese airstrikes against South Sudan, things ultimately settled down. On 26 September, an agreement was reached about borders, natural resources and security, finally ending the crisis.

Air Campaign 

Note: Since Sudan does not allow journalists into conflict areas, reports of the bombings and the conflict are by-and-large reported by sources in South Sudan or those allied with the Sudan People's Liberation Army. Sudan claims that it has exclusively bombed South Sudanese military positions and denies all further allegations.

Weapons 

The Sudanese Army is equipped with predominantly Chinese and Soviet-made weapons while Sudan People's Liberation Army weapons vary, having few vehicles and mostly small arms. The following table should not be considered exhaustive.

Negotiations 
In a meeting with Egypt's foreign minister on 15 April, Mohamed Kamel Amr, who had arrived in Khartoum to try to contain tensions, Omar Bashir ruled out any negotiations with South Sudan until the Southern forces vacated Heglig. According to mediator Thabo Mbeki, as of 22 May, both Sudans said they were ready to return to the negotiating table.

Resolution 
The two parties restarted negotiations in June 2012 under mediation by the African Union's envoy Thabo Mbeki.

On 27 September, Sudanese President Omar al-Bashir and South Sudanese President Salva Kiir signed eight agreements in Addis Ababa, Ethiopia, which led the way to resume important oil exports and create a  demilitarised zone along their border. The agreements allows for the return of 350,000 barrels of South Sudanese oil to the world market. In addition, the agreements include an understanding on the parameters to follow in regards to demarcating their border, an economic-cooperation agreement and a deal to protect each other's citizens. Certain issues remain unsolved and future talks are scheduled to resolve them. At the same time as the ongoing General debate of the sixty-seventh session of the United Nations General Assembly on the same day, South Sudan was scheduled to speak. Vice President Riek Machar outlined what agreements were signed, but lamented the lack of a resolution on Abyei.

United Nations Secretary-General Ban Ki-moon commended the two leaders on reaching an agreement. Ethiopian Prime Minister Hailemariam Desalegn also praised the outcome and hoped it would build momentum.

In mid-March 2013, both countries began to withdraw their forces from the border area in a bid to creating a demilitarised buffer zone and resume South Sudanese oil production for export through Sudan. In early April South Sudanese oil started to flow through pipelines in Sudan again. Though Sudanese President Omar al-Bashir threatened to cut oil transit through his country from South Sudan, South Sudanese President Salvar Kiir accused him of mobilising for war and said that he would not go to war over the oil transit issue.

In October 2013, al-Bashir visited Juba to discuss the measures with Kiir. He was warmly welcomed and said that progress had been made. Kiir for his part said that he was looking to mend relations with Sudan.

Humanitarian situation 

The conflict had, by 14 April, forced over 100,000 people to flee their homes.

Responses

Domestic response in Sudan 

Sudanese national radio announced that the President of Sudan, Omar al-Bashir, would suspend his planned visit to the South Sudanese capital, Juba, as a result of the conflict. A summit between the leaders of the two countries had been planned to be held in Juba some time in April 2012, following on from the meeting of the political, military, and security committee of the African Union on 30 March in Addis Ababa, Ethiopia. A meeting between South Sudan and Sudan on the subject of the disputed region of Abyei scheduled to have been held on 22 March had previously been postponed by Sudan. Vice President Al-Haj Adam of Sudan formally declared that a state of war existed between the two countries late on 11 April and declared that all negotiations between the two states were on hold.

On 16 April, Sudan's parliament met and voted unanimously to declare that "South Sudan is an enemy of all Sudanese state agencies" The parliamentary speaker called for Sudan to mobilise all its resources to fight South Sudan and topple their government. Rabie Abdelaty, a spokesman for the Khartoum government, ruled out peace talks with the south, saying it would hurt national pride if Sudan did not take back Heglig by force. Sudan began a general mobilisation of its armed forces as South Sudanese forces penetrated as far north as 70 kilometres into Sudanese territory, according to Rahmatullah Mohamed Osman, Under Secretary for the Foreign Ministry. During Friday prayers on 13 April in Sudan, some sermons were reportedly hostile towards South Sudan, while television broadcasts included allegedly ''jihadi' and patriotic songs.

Following South Sudan's withdrawal from Heglig, President Omar al-Bashir declared that there would be no negotiations with the "poisonous insects" (i.e. the South Sudanese). Later on, Bashir argued that the South Sudanese only understand the "language of guns and ammunition." Sudan's UN ambassador, Daffa-Alla Elhag Ali Osman, argued that Sudan had the right to act in self-defense because "We have been targeted by... the South", adding that "Let me make it clear: We will not cross the international border and attack the South... inside their territories".

Domestic response in South Sudan 
The President of South Sudan, Salva Kiir, suggested that the Republic of Sudan was responsible for initiating the conflict, and that further clashes could lead to war: "This morning [the Sudanese] air force came and bombed areas in Unity state. After this intensive bombardment our forces were attacked by [the Sudanese military] and militia." It is a war that has been imposed on us again, but it is [the Sudanese] who are looking for it." The spokesman for the South Sudanese military suggested that the conflict was "the biggest confrontation since independence".

Parliamentary Speaker James Wani Igga called on people to prepare for war: "Khartoum might be meaning a real war ... if you don't defend yourself, you will be finished, so you should go and mobilise the people on [the] ground to be ready" Parliament later decided to raise military spending and bolster the army by cutting salaries of all deputies by 10% for three months.

Fuel supplies began to run out in some filling stations in Juba around 15 April as huge queues of motorists tried to fill up as panic buying set in.

International reactions 
 
On 27 March, a spokesman for Ban Ki-moon, the Secretary-General of the United Nations, called for the two countries to end the conflict and "use to the fullest extent existing political and security mechanisms to peacefully address their differences". On 23 April 2012, Ban Ki-moon condemned Sudan's bombing of border areas in South Sudan, demanding Khartoum cease all hostilities "as a matter of urgency".

 
On 15 April 2012, the Arab Parliament called on South Sudan for restraint and to withdraw from the town of Heglig. A statement signed by Arab Parliament head Salem Deqbasi said that the Arab Parliament's bureau called on South Sudan to "heed the voice of reason" and immediately pull its forces out of the areas it had occupied inside Sudanese territory, including Heglig. On 26 April, the Arab League escalated its rhetoric, condemning South Sudan's "aggression" and saying Heglig belongs to Sudan. The Arab League went further to say it supported Sudan's "right to defend itself", and condemned South Sudan's alleged support of rebels in Sudan.

 
On 25 April 2012, the African Union condemned Sudan's bombing of parts of South Sudan, and called on both sides to cease all hostilities. The Peace and Security Council also put forth a 7-point roadmap in which the two sides would be given two weeks to restart negotiations. The AU urged both sides to refrain from "inflammatory statements and propaganda that could fuel the conflict".

 
On 15 April 2012, according to IRIB World Service, an Iran Broadcasting channel, Iranian Foreign Ministry Spokesman Ramin Mehmanparast said that Iran fully monitors the developments in the region, and calls on South Sudan to immediately and unconditionally pull back its forces and return to its territory behind the designated borders. In March an Iranian surveillance drone crashed in Sudan after being fired upon by South Sudanese-backed rebels.

 
Israel allegedly airlifted military hardware to the South Sudanese armed forces "on a daily basis" during the conflict.

 
On 27 March 2012, the President of Kenya, Mwai Kibaki, suggested that Kenya could mediate between the two countries, stating "Kenya is keen on good and stable relations between the two countries".

 
On 6 May 2012, Africa Minister Henry Bellingham supported the African Union-led initiative, calling for both sides to restart negotiations and comply with the ceasefire.

 

On 11 April 2012, the US State Department condemned South Sudan's seizure of Heglig and in statement said "We condemn South Sudan's military involvement in the attack on and seizure of Heglig, an act which goes beyond self-defense and has increased tensions between Sudan and South Sudan to dangerous levels." Later on, however, the US took a different tone, condemning Khartoum's bombardment of South Sudanese territory and "military incursion into South Sudan". To South Sudan, the US release recognized the "right of South Sudan to self-defense", but urged "restraint in its reaction to Sudan’s attack in Unity State". The US welcomed the South Sudanese withdrawal from Heglig and called for all South Sudanese troops to be withdrawn from areas across the 1 January 1956 border. In his message to the Sudanese and South Sudanese people, President Obama reiterated that "All those who are fighting must recognize that there is no military solution."

 
On 22 September 2012, Vietnamese Foreign Ministry Spokesman Luong Thanh Nghi calls for "concerned parties to abide by the international law and signed agreements, to restrain themselves and keep tensions from escalating while working on resolving disagreements by peaceful negotiations,"
 
On 21 April 2012, Yemen condemned South Sudan's occupation of Heglig, called for both parties to give diplomatic efforts a chance, and argued both sides should "establish ties enhancing the mutual confidence and building on the bonds of common history and human relations between the two countries."

See also 

 List of border conflicts
 South Sudan–Sudan relations
 History of Sudan
 History of South Sudan

References

Further reading 
 
 
 

Conflicts in 2012
Wars involving Sudan
Wars involving South Sudan
South Sudan–Sudan border
South Sudan–Sudan relations
2012 in Sudan
2012 in South Sudan